Tadashi "Tad" Nakamura (born c. 1980) is an American documentary filmmaker. He is noted for films about the Asian-American and Japanese-American communities in the United States. 

His 2013 film, Jake Shimabukuro: Life on Four Strings, received a 2013 Gotham Award.

Education 
Nakamura graduated with a bachelor's degree in Asian-American studies from the University of California, Los Angeles (UCLA) in 2003. He received his MFA in Social Documentation from the University of California, Santa Cruz (UCSC) in 2008.

Career 
Nakamura's films focus on the Japanese American experience. Three of his films, Yellow Brotherhood, Pilgrimage, and A Song for Ourselves, form a documentary trilogy about Asian Americans and the importance of community. His films are frequently shown at film festivals, where they have won numerous awards. 

His 2013 film, Jake Shimabukuro: Life on Four Strings, is a full-length documentary about Jake Shimabukuro, a Japanese American ukulele virtuoso and composer from Hawaii. The film won the 2013 Gotham Audience Award for Independent Films.

Personal life 
Nakamura is a fourth generation Japanese American, born and raised in Los Angeles. His father, Robert A. Nakamura, is also a filmmaker and is sometimes referred to as "the Godfather of Asian American media". His mother is the author and filmmaker Karen L. Ishizuka.

Filmography 
 Yellow Brotherhood (2003)
 Pilgrimage (2007)
 A Song for Ourselves (2009)
 Jake Shimabukuro: Life on Four Strings (2012)
 Mele Murals (2016)
Atomic Café: The Noisiest Corner in J-Town (2020)

References

Further reading
 Nakamura was included in this list compiled for the DOC NYC film festival.

External links

 Nakamura's personal website.

University of California, Santa Cruz alumni
University of California, Los Angeles alumni
1980s births
Living people
American filmmakers
American film directors of Japanese descent